Stateline Dam (National ID # UT10156) is a dam in Summit County, Utah, less than a half-mile south of the Utah-Wyoming state line.

The earthen rockfill dam was constructed between 1977 and 1979 by the United States Bureau of Reclamation with a height of 143 feet and 2900 feet long at its crest.  It impounds East Fork of Smiths Fork for flood control and irrigation storage, part of the Lyman Project, along with the nearby Meeks Cabin Dam.  The dam is owned by the Bureau and is operated by the local Bridger Valley Water Conservancy District.

The reservoir it creates, Stateline Reservoir, has a water surface of 304 acres and has a maximum capacity of 12,000 acre-feet.  Recreation includes fishing (for rainbow, brook, and cutthroat trout), boating, and camping at 41 Forest Service campsites.  Although public access is unrestricted and the water quality is excellent, the water is too cold for most swimmers.

References 

Dams in Utah
Reservoirs in Utah
United States Bureau of Reclamation dams
Dams completed in 1979
Buildings and structures in Summit County, Utah
Lakes of Summit County, Utah